Dukhovshchina is the name of several inhabited localities in Russia.

Urban localities
Dukhovshchina, Smolensk Oblast, a town in Dukhovshchinsky District of Smolensk Oblast

Rural localities
Dukhovshchina, Irkutsk Oblast, a village in Bayandayevsky District of Irkutsk Oblast